You Lie may refer to:

 "You Lie" (Reba McEntire song), from the album Rumor Has It
 "You Lie" (The Band Perry song), from the album The Band Perry
 "You lie!", an outburst by U.S. politician Joe Wilson